The Downtown Haines City Commercial District is a U.S. historic district (designated as such on March 7, 1994) located in Haines City, Florida. The district is bounded by Hinson and Ingraham Avenues, and 4th and 7th Streets. It contains 20 historic buildings.

Gallery

References

External links
 Polk County listings at National Register of Historic Places

National Register of Historic Places in Polk County, Florida
Historic districts on the National Register of Historic Places in Florida
Haines City, Florida